Habiba (Arabic: حَبِيْبَه, ḥabībah), alternatively Habibah and Habeeba  , is a female given name of Arabic origin meaning beloved, sweetheart, or lover, stemming from the male name Habib. 
 
Habiba or Habibah may refer to:

People
Habiba of Valencia (also known as Thoma; died 1127), Arab Andalusian scholar
Habiba bint Jahsh, a companion of the Islamic prophet, Muhammad
Habiba Mohamed Ahmed Alymohmed (born 1999), Egyptian squash player
Habiba Zehi Ben Romdhane (born 1950), Tunisian minister
Habiba Bouhamed Chaabouni, Tunisian Professor of Medical Genetics
Habiba Dembélé, Ivorian journalist
Habiba Djahnine (born 1968), Algerian film producer
Habiba Ghribi (born 1984), Tunisian athlete
Habiba Nosheen (born 1982), Pakistani-Canadian journalist
Habiba Ahmed Abd Elaziz Ramadan (1986–2013), Egyptian journalist and activist
Habiba Sarābi (born 1956), Afghan physician
Habibah binte Ubayd-Allah, a companion of the Islamic prophet, Muhammad
Habibah bint Kharijah ibn Zayd ibn Abi Zuhayr, wife of Abu Bakr, the first Muslim Caliph following Muhammad's death
Umm Habiba (or Ramla bint Abi Sufyan; c.594–666), a wife of Muhammad

Other uses
Hassan and Habibah, British television presenters
Habibas Islands, located just north of the Algerian coast

Feminine given names
Arabic feminine given names
Bosnian feminine given names
Pakistani feminine given names